The Monitor, also known as Midway-Como-North End Monitor and formerly the Midway Como Monitor, is a newspaper in Saint Paul, Minnesota. The newspaper is published monthly. The newspaper has a circulation of 30,000 with 21,500 being delivered to homes. It has an estimated readership of 65,500, which means it reaches about 25% of Saint Paul. The North End News, another community newspaper that existed for more than 30 years, ceased publishing in February 2007 and merged with the Midway Como Monitor. The paper was renamed the Monitor in April 2007 and the circulation was expanded from 20,000 to its present 30,000.

References

Newspapers published in Minnesota
Mass media in Minneapolis–Saint Paul